Jade War is a 2019 fantasy novel by Fonda Lee published by Orbit and is the sequel to Jade City. It follows the island of Kekon as the jade-controlling clans are embroiled in an international war where jade is the centerpiece. The story takes place over several years. It is the second book in the Green Bone saga, followed by Jade Legacy which will be the final novel in the series.

Plot 
Kaul Sen passes away shortly after the events of Jade City, and just before his funeral, thief Bero and his partner Mudt rob Kaul Lan's corpse of his jade. Hilo struggles to maintain his power as the Pillar of the No Peak Clan, and enters an uneasy truce with the Mountain clan. Outside of Kekon, war is waged between Shotar and Ygutan over the disputed Oortoko region, with Kekon's ally, Espenia, supporting Shotar. 

Anden, still refusing to wear jade after killing Gont Asch in Jade City, is given the opportunity to go to the Espenian city of Port Massy to study. Hilo and Shae frame this as an opportunity for him to serve the clan, supporting their interests abroad without having to wear jade. 

At the same time, a cousin of the Kaul family is imprisoned in the Uwiwa Islands, only to be freed by Zapunyo, a crime lord who has gotten rich off jade smuggling during the clan war. Zapunyo is supported in part by barukan, who are Kekonese-Shotarian jade users. Hilo meets Zapunyo, who offers Hilo an opportunity to profit off his jade smuggling. Hilo refuses, believing Zapunyo to be inconsequential. Meanwhile, Shae struggles in her position as the Weather Man of the No Peak Clan. She locates her predecessor, Doru, but hesitates to deliver clan justice, and Doru kills himself first. This causes Shae to lose face in front of her Master Luckbringer, Hami Tumashon.

Anden initially struggles to fit in within Espenia but finds out that many Kekonese in his city have created their own pseudo-clan, and partake in a fight club underneath a recreational center every week. He befriends and develops a romance with Cory, the Pillar's son. Wen, Hilo's wife, is pregnant but continues her duties as a spy. She infiltrates Espenian and Ygutanian networks in order to retrieve information for the No Peak Clan and aid their disputes with the Mountain Clan. Wen discovers that Lan had a son named Niko with his ex-wife, Eyni. Hilo travels to Stepenland to ask that Eyni let Niko live with the family in Kekon for half the year and be raised as a Green Bone. After Eyni refuses to do so, Hilo kills her and takes the boy with him back to Janloon to be treated as the heir to the Pillar of No Peak.

Shae and Wen arrange deals with foreign countries so as to sabotage the Mountain's jade distribution, which is initially successful and ends with peace negotiations with the Mountain led by Ayt Mada and Hilo. These negotiations ultimately deteriorate when Shae duels Ayt Mada to protect her honor after the Mountain spread claims of her treachery due to her studying abroad in Espenia as a college student. At the same time, Shae leads a secret relationship with a college professor Maro but struggles to keep it together when he discovers that she had an abortion. 

Hilo pursues Bero and Mudt, who have gotten themselves involved in companies dealing with illegal jade distribution. Mudt betrays and seemingly kills Bero, but Hilo kills Mudt believing that he was the one who murdered Lan. Maro becomes involved with Shotarian spies, who had killed Kehn, one of the No Peak Fists, after No Peak discovered their illicit jade smuggling; Shae is forced to kill Maro to her great distress. Hilo attempts to form a truce with the Shotarian mobsters on Espenia but finds that they are embroiled in their own internal war, and he inflames it by granting them jade access. Wen and Anden, in revenge for Shotarian agents killing Kehn, corner Zapunyo but are captured and nearly suffocated by the Espenian gang. They are narrowly rescued and the Pillar of the Espenian Kekonese clan promises to aid No Peak, while Anden breaks off his relationship with Cory. Anden returns to Janloon and decides to become a jade doctor after using jade for the first time in years to resuscitate Wen. 

The international war ends and the Mountain takes in the Ygutanian refugees, ultimately succeeding in using the war to their advantage and one-upping No Peak. Hilo trains his stone-eye son, daughter, and nephew-turned-adopted son in the ways of No Peak. Shae confronts Ayt Mada once more and the conflict between the Mountain and No Peak resumes. An alive Bero joins up with resistance within Janloon to overthrow Hilo.

Reception 
Jason Sheehan of NPR was quick to notice the way "Lee has created an entire modern world here, complete and round with its own history, customs, traditions, language", as well as the way Jade War is "broader and wider" than the first novel. Sheehan noted the continued The Godfather references, saying that "If The Godfather never was, Jade War (and Jade City) would be how we define generational organized crime stories today" to acclaim Lee's work. He concluded that he admired the way Lee "juggles the personal and the epic with deft, admirable skill...a magical, almost operatic crime and family drama...[with] jade-fueled supermen (and women) come with human hearts that bend and break the same as ours." Library Journal gave the novel a starred review, calling it a "smart and action-filled fantasy" complete with "many female characters front and center," finding the set-up for Jade Legacy to be particularly well-done. Kirkus Reviews was also lavish in their praise, with their starred review adding that the story was a "strong, thoughtful, and fast-paced ...that bodes well for future volumes." Fantasy Book Review also praised the novel heavily. Jade War earned a starred review and weekly pick status from Publishers Weekly, stating "Lee’s story is sweeping, leisurely, and epic, and combines political intrigue with sharply choreographed action scenes, but it’s a character-driven family drama at its heart. Conflict ranges from delicate boardroom negotiations to dramatic duels, and from assassinations to all-out war, while the increasingly complex narrative continually ups the stakes."

Awards and nominations 
Jade War was nominated for the Dragon Award for Best Fantasy Novel, the Aurora Award for Best Novel, the Ignyte Award for Best Novel - Adult, and the Locus Award for Best Fantasy Novel.

Adaptations 
In 2020, it was announced that a TV series based on the first novel in The Green Bone Saga, Jade City, was being developed at Peacock, with Lee serving as a consulting producer. In July 2022, it was announced that Peacock had canceled the project, but Lee shared on Twitter that the team were seeking another service to take it up.

References

External Links 
 'Jade War' is a Magical, Operatic Crime and Family Drama, Jason Sheehan, NPR
 Jade War by Fonda Lee, Publishers Weekly
 Jade War by Fonda Lee, Library Journal
 Jade War by Fonda Lee, Kirkus Reviews

2019 Canadian novels
2019 American novels
2019 fantasy novels
Orbit Books books